This is a list of both current and former artists who have recorded for Fearless Records. Listed in parentheses are names of Fearless affiliated labels, under which the artist recorded.

This list is not complete.

Current artists

 The Aquabats
 As It Is
 August Burns Red
 Breathe Carolina
 Chase Atlantic
 Chunk! No, Captain Chunk!
 The Color Morale
 The Downtown Fiction
 Eve 6
 For All Those Sleeping
 Forever the Sickest Kids
 I Don't Know How But They Found Me
 Mayday Parade
 Motionless In White
 Pierce the Veil
 Real Friends
 Set It Off
 The Summer Set
 Tonight Alive
 Until I Wake

Outerloop Records artist

 Chasing Safety
 Jason Lancaster
 Ice Nine Kills
 Youth in Revolt

Old Friends Records artist

 Hellogoodbye

Former artists

Active
 30 Foot Fall 
 Alesana 
 Artist vs. Poet 
 Bigwig 
 Blessthefall 
 Gob 
 Plain White T's 
 Portugal. The Man 
 A Skylit Drive 
 Sparks the Rescue 
 The Maine 
 The Outline 
 Upon This Dawning 

Inactive

 At the Drive-In
 Anatomy of a Ghost 
 Amely
 Bazookas Go Bang! 
 Beefcake 
 Bickley 
 Blount 
 Brazil
 Chuck
 Classic Case
 Cruiserweight
 Dead Lazlo's Place
 Drunk In Public
 Dynamite Boy
 Every Avenue 
 Eye Alaska
 Family Values
 Fed Up
 The Fully Down
 Gatsbys American Dream
 Get Scared
 Glasseater
 Glue Gun
 Go Radio
 Grabbers
 Junction 18
 Jakiro
 Keepsake
 The Killing Moon
 The Kinison
 Knockout
 Let's Get It 
 Logan Square
 Lonely Kings 
 Lostprophets
 Sugarcult 
 The Morning Light
 Motherfist
 Near Miss 
 Nipdrivers
 Red Fish
 Rock Kills Kid
 RPM
 So They Say
 The Static Jacks
 A Static Lullaby 
 Straight Faced
 Superman Please Dont
 White Kaps
 Yesterdays Rising

Fearless